Yael Esteban Martínez Velázquez (born 1984) is a Mexican photographer, based in Guerrero. He is a freelance photographer that photographs for Magnum Photos. In 2019 he won the W. Eugene Smith Grant from the W. Eugene Smith Memorial Fund. His photographs capture a feeling of emptiness and pain suffered by those affected by crime in their region.

Awards
2016: Magnum Foundation, Emergency Fund grant
2019 2nd Prize, Long-Term Projects, Stories, World Press Photo, for The House That Bleeds
2019: W. Eugene Smith Grant, W. Eugene Smith Memorial Fund, a prize of $40,000

References

External links

Mexican photographers
People from Guerrero
1984 births
Living people